Fulvoclysia subdolana is a species of moth of the family Tortricidae. It is found in the Caucasus, Syria, Iraq and Iran.

References

Moths described in 1901
Cochylini
Taxa named by Julius von Kennel